Moundville is the name of several places in the United States:

Moundville, Alabama
Moundville Archaeological Site, a prehistoric chiefdom center near Tuscaloosa, Alabama
Moundville, Missouri
Moundville, Wisconsin

See also
Moundsville, West Virginia